Maranatha Christian School (MCS) is a PreK-12 private coeducational Christian school in San Diego County, California. The school consists of separate campuses for its preschool and K-12 programs, both located on the west side of the 4S Ranch & Rancho Bernardo community. Meanwhile, the preschool campus is located on the property of Maranatha Chapel.

Locations

The school is located on a 17.5 acre campus just west of Rancho Bernardo's 4S Ranch and east of Rancho Santa Fe.
 Maranatha Christian Schools - 9050 Maranatha Drive San Diego, CA 92127
 Maranatha Chapel - 10752 Coastwood Road San Diego, CA 92127
The campus for MCS now contains a gymnasium, a football field, soccer field, baseball field, a weight room, and computer + scientific lab rooms. These new baseball and soccer fields were finally added in 2019. The football field was also redone at the same time.

Mission and Goals

Maranatha Christian School is a Christ-centered learning community where students experience God’s love, are equipped to fulfill God's unique call and purpose, and excel in their God-given potential through academics, arts, and athletics. MCS exists to provide a nurturing, comprehensive, and educational program.

Athletics

Maranatha Christian has the following sports:
 Fall sports: cross country, football, cheerleading, girls' golf and girls' volleyball.
 Winter sports: boys' basketball, cheerleading, girls' basketball, boys' soccer, and girls' soccer.
 Spring sports: baseball, boys' golf, softball, track and field and boys' volleyball.
 Maranatha also has a dance team called the Spirit Squad.

Honors and Advanced Placement courses 

Maranatha offers 5 Honors courses for high school:
 English 9 and English 10
 Engineering II
 Algebra II
 World History (Only for Grade 9)
They also offer 17 Advanced Placement courses such as:
 Sciences: Biology, Chemistry, Computer Science Principles, Physics I, and        Physics II
 Math: Calculus AB, Calculus BC, Computer Science A, Statistics
 English: English Language and English Literature 
 History: European History, U.S. History, U.S. Government
 Ect: Spanish Language, Photography and Studio Art 2D
AP is an open-enrollment program.

Websites + Links

 Maranatha Christian Schools
 Maranatha Christian Athletics
 Follow @mcs_eagles on Instagram
 Follow @mcsathletics on Instagram
 Follow @mcs_asb on Instagram

Christian schools in California
Private middle schools in California 
Private elementary schools in California 
Private high schools in California